Udayagiri (Odia: ଉଦୟଗିରି) is the largest Buddhist complex in the Indian state of Odisha. It is composed of major stupas and monasteries (viharas). Together with the nearby complexes of Lalitgiri and Ratnagiri, it is part of the "Diamond Triangle" of the "Ratnagiri-Udayagiri-Lalitgiri" complex.  It used to be thought that one or all of these were the Pushpagiri Vihara known from ancient records, but this has now been convincingly located at a different site. Per epigraphical artifacts found at the site, Udayagiri's historical name was "Madhavapura Mahavihara." This Buddhist complex, preceded by the Ratnagiri and Lalitgiri sites, with their monasteries, is believed to have been active between the 7th and the 12th centuries.

Location
As the crow flies, Ratnagiri and Udaygiri are about 11 km apart, and both about 7 km from Lalitgiri. The site now recognised as Puspagiri is some 18 km distant from Udaygiri, the closest to it of the "triangle" sites.

Findings
Numerous excavations by the Archaeological Survey of India (ASI) have been conducted at Udayagiri since 1958. The Udayagiri Site 1, the first site to be excavated, is in a depression between two valleys. In the excavations done during the period between 1985–86 and 1989–90, at the Udayagiri Site 2, the antiquities exposed consisted of a Buddhist Monastic complex enclosed within a compound wall, including a stupa of  height with four images of dhyani Buddhas fixed at its four cardinal points. On the basis of the epigraphical evidence archaeologist have inferred that this site is "Madhavapura Mahavihara". During the large excavation from 1997 to 2000, a second part of Udayagiri-2 was discovered with additional stupas and monasteries. These antiquities consist of two eighth century monastic complexes, statues of Buddha, Tara, Manjusri, Avalokiteśvara, Jatamukuta Lokesvara and many terracotta (earthenware) seals. A stepped stone well with epigraphic inscriptions has also been discovered. Also seen near one of the entry gates at the site is a human figure swinging on a rope, with eyes closed, in a state of perfect happiness.

During the recent investigations conducted between 2001 and 2004 the antiquities unearthed included a stone finish flooring in the foreground of the excavated monastery, the main drain of the monastery flowing out to the north, a large stone raised platform  in size built in seven layers with ashlar masonry accessed through a series of steps, and marked in its northern end by a chandrashila (moon rock). Also found were apsidal chaitya-grihas (an old one replaced by another built in brick) facing east with a stupa diefied in it, built with stone and bricks, founded on the raised platform, and remnants of stone jali embellished with the theme of a three-hooked snake inferred as gavakshas (horse-shoe arches).

Images of Tara in the form of Tara Kurukulla or Kurukulla Tara have been reported from Udayagiri and also from Lalitgiri and Ratnagiri; these are an emanation form of Amitābha seated in a lalitasana posture. Images of Hariti have been found in Udayagiri and also in Lalitgiri and Ratnagiri. This image portrays the goodess in a seated position breast feeding a child or with the child seated on its lap. Hariti was once a child abductor, but Buddha persuaded her to become the protector of children.

Also seen in the western, southern and northern parts of the chaitya-griha are remnants of a number of stupas in three groups, built in stone with only their plain plinths seen in a preserved state. An important discovery in the precincts of the chaitya-griha, is of statues of Avalokiteswara, Tathāgata, Bhikruti-Tara and Chunda embedded in niches, marking the four cardinal points. Other findings are of 14 stupas (built in brick with mud mortar) dated between the 1st and 12th centuries, and also many 5th- to 13th-century epigraphs. Votive stupas, made of stone, are also seen along a stone paved path. At the eastern part of the chaitya-griha are residential houses consisting of six rooms with artifacts of domestic goods.

Gallery

References

Bibliography

Further reading
 Donaldson, Thomas Eugene, Iconography of the Buddhist Sculpture of Odisha, 2001, Abhinav Publications, Volume 1 is the text, given page references, and 2 the plates, given figure numbers.

External links
Flickr.com: Photos of Udayagiri Complex

Buddhist sites in Odisha
Buddhist monasteries in India
Buddhist pilgrimage sites in India
Ancient universities of the Indian subcontinent
Buddhist universities and colleges
Archaeological sites in Odisha
Buildings and structures in Jajpur district
Defunct Buddhist monasteries
Education in Odisha
Former Buddhist temples
Former populated places in India
History of Odisha
Ruins in India
Stupas in India
6th-century Buddhist temples
6th-century Buddhism
Educational institutions established in the 6th century
6th-century establishments in India
12th-century disestablishments in India
Archaeological monuments in Odisha
Buddhism in Odisha
Indian Buddhist sculpture